Idaea retractaria is a species of geometrid moth in the family Geometridae. It was described by Francis Walker in 1861 and is found in North America.

The MONA or Hodges number for Idaea retractaria is 7124.

References

 Scoble, Malcolm J., ed. (1999). Geometrid Moths of the World: A Catalogue (Lepidoptera, Geometridae), 1016.

Further reading

External links

 Butterflies and Moths of North America

Sterrhini
Moths described in 1861